Gerlach, Nevada is a census-designated place (CDP) in Washoe County, Nevada, United States. The population was 107 at the 2018 American Community Survey. It is part of the Reno–Sparks Metropolitan Statistical Area. Prior to 2010, Gerlach was part of the Gerlach–Empire census-designated place. The town of Empire is now a separate CDP. The Fly Geyser is located near Gerlach.

History

Gerlach was founded in 1906 during the construction of the Western Pacific Railroad Feather River Route.

In 1997, the town and its homes and bars were used by the British team of the Thrust SSC  supersonic car, as they pursued their goal of being the first to go faster than the speed of sound, which was achieved on October 15, 1997. The record still stands today. The Black Rock Saloon in the town kept track of the progress, given at the same time, Craig Breedlove attempted his own pursuit of the sound barrier. In 2017, several members of the former Thrust team revisited Gerlach for a reunion to mark the 20th anniversary. 

In 2009, the Space Chair was lofted to near space north of Gerlach.

Geography

Demographics

Climate
Gerlach has a steppe climate (Bsk).

Economy
The economy of Gerlach focuses on tourism in the nearby Black Rock Desert, and hunting. Gypsum mining was the historic staple of the local economy. Nearby Empire was a company town of the United States Gypsum Corporation (USG) until the plant closed on January 31, 2011, eliminating 95 jobs. In 2016, the town of Empire was purchased by the Empire Mining Company, who have re-opened gypsum mining operations, and have begun to rehabilitate the houses in town.

The other major industries are a Union Pacific switching station in Gerlach and public services of Washoe County, which includes its roads department and a K–12 public school owned by the Washoe County School District; the future of the Gerlach K–12 School is uncertain, as it is estimated after the gypsum plant closed in 2011, only around a dozen children remained in Gerlach. Many of the inhabitants of Gerlach are elderly retirees. Many people in Gerlach also have small private businesses. Many businesses are Internet-based, due to the town's remote Nevada location. Hunters from all over the west travel to Gerlach to hunt a wide variety of game such as chukar, geese, deer, antelope, etc.

Since 1990, Burning Man, a week-long countercultural festival attended by 68,000, has been held nearby. The event is responsible for around 25% of the yearly sales at the few commercial establishments in the area, which include the closest permanent fuel and grocery stops to the Burning Man event site. The Black Rock Desert is also the site of many other recreational activities throughout the year.

Government
Gerlach previously had a volunteer fire department, but in 2015 the entire department resigned. The county had plans to establish fire services.

Transportation
Primary highway access to Gerlach is provided by State Route 447.  It can also be accessed via three former state highways: State Route 34, State Route 48, and State Route 49 (also known as Jungo Road).

Gerlach has an airfield, simply a graded dirt strip, which is no longer usable. It should not be used unless under emergency.

The California Zephyr inter-city rail service was routed through Gerlach from its inception in 1949 until the end of its pre-Amtrak incarnation in 1970, providing direct service from Oakland, California to Chicago.

In popular culture
Gerlach was one of the film locations for the film Far From Home (1989). Gerlach was also the site for Gary Cooper's first (credited) film, The Winning of Barbara Worth (1926).

Media
Gerlach has two non-profit community-based radio stations.  KFBR 91.5  is run by Friends of Black Rock/High Rock, and has a studio at Jalisco's on Main Street.  KLAP 89.5 is run by Open Sky Radio Corp and broadcast from a studio located at 395 Main Street in the old Gerlach Gas Station and Garage Building Office.

Education
Washoe County School District operates Gerlach K-12 School. 

Ernest M. Johnson School, initially an elementary school in Empire, moved to the Gerlach High School site in Gerlach in 2001. By 2000 the school's address was already in Gerlach. Johnson became a K-12 school in 2011. 

Gerlach High, a grade 6-12 school, opened in 1931, and got a new building in 1955 as the original building was destroyed by a fire. The fire occurred in January 1955.

Gerlach has a public library, a branch of the Washoe County Library System, on the school property.

References

External links

Visit Gerlach/ Gerlach General Improvement District

Census-designated places in Nevada
Census-designated places in Washoe County, Nevada
Nevada historical markers
Reno, NV Metropolitan Statistical Area
Populated places established in 1905
1905 establishments in Nevada